Victor Partnoi (born November 27, 1970) is a Romanian sprint canoer who competed in the 1990s. He won two medals at the ICF Canoe Sprint World Championships in the C-1 1000 m event with a silver in 1993 and a bronze in 1994.

Partnoi also competed in two Summer Olympics, earning his best finish of sixth in the C-1 1000 m event at Atlanta in 1996.

References

Sports-reference.com profile

1970 births
Canoeists at the 1992 Summer Olympics
Canoeists at the 1996 Summer Olympics
Living people
Olympic canoeists of Romania
Romanian male canoeists
ICF Canoe Sprint World Championships medalists in Canadian